Herman Puig (born German Puig Paredes; 25 February 1928 in Sagua La Grande – 25 January 2021 in Barcelona) was the founder of the first Cinemateca de Cuba and pioneer of male nude photography. Born in Havana, Cuba, where he began his early work, his ascendance comes from Catalonia. He rose to fame in France.

Biography

Early years 
He studied painting and sculpture in Cuba and filmed his first short "Sarna" before leaving for Paris at the age of 20 where he studied Audio Visual Techniques. In 1950 he worked for Henri Langlois director and co-founder of the Cinémathèque Française. This association lead to the foundation of the original Cinemateca de Cuba, officialised as an institution in 1948, and founded by Herman Puig and Ricardo Vigón, which would later be reborn in 1961 with the initiative of Alfredo Guevara and the then newly formed ICAIC as today's Cuba Cinemateca.

Puig, along with a group that included Carlos Franqui, the future ICAIC cameraman Ramón F. Suárez, and the writers Edmundo Desnoes and Guillermo Cabrera Infante (Tres tristes tigres) made a number of short films. Herman Puig, together with Carlos Franqui, made a short film (Carta de una madre, Letter to a mother). Puig and Edmundo Desnoes also made a short, Sarna (1952), which was produced and edited by cinematographer Ramón F. Suárez.

Cinema to Male Nude Photography 
In October 1950 Herman Puig travelled to Paris where he met with Henri Langlois, the director of the Cinémathèque Française. Their first encounter was brief but decisive as Henri Langlois agreed to supply him with French films for their Cinema Club of Havana (the early Cinemateca de Cuba) but on the condition that their small Cinema Club became an official institution as the Cinémathèque Française could only legally exchange films with a similar institution. Unforeseen political elements resulted in the closure of the Cinemateca a few months later and it would not open again until 1961, but Herman's love affair with France was cemented, along with his place in Cuban Cinema history.

From the 60s to the 70s Puig worked in advertising as a photographer and publicity filmmaker in Spain. It was in Madrid that he first started experimenting with male nudes but was arrested in an alleged drugs affair and charged as a pornographer under the climate of the socialist government. It was at this point that he moved to Paris in an attempt to prove to Spain and the world that he was not a pornographer but an artist and was accepted with almost universal acclaim. A little later he moved to Barcelona where he remains to this day.

Modern Herman 
Herman Puig was made the subject of a film by David Boisseaux-Chical about his cultural exile from Cuba. In the film he continues to affirm his dislike at being associated with the worlds of pornography and homosexuality, simply for wanting to photograph male bodies as art instead of that of women. Puig recently spoke out along in his conference with author Zoé Valdés in Palma de Mallorca about beauty and art and the restrictions placed upon expression in Cuba.

The Hidden Cinemateca 
Puig often stated that he was the original founder of the Cinemateca de Cuba, stating that the ICAIC, with the goal of making the myth live that the history of Cuban cinema began with the creation of the ICAIC in 1959, has hidden the truth from sight. The attempted suppression of his involvement, along with that of Ricardo Vigón, from history for political means has aided in sheltering Herman from the Cuban community as he frequently refuses to exhibit his work in Cuba in fear of his being mistaken as a sympathizer with the Communist regime. El Ateneo de Madrid officially acknowledged them as the founders of the Cinemateca de Cuba with a tribute to German Puig in October 2009.

Death 
Herman Puig died on 25 January 2021, one month short from his 93rd birthday.

References

Notes

External links
 Juan Cruz "Herman Puig fotografía el desnudo masculino", June 13, 1979, elPais (Spanish)
 Herman speaks out in Majorca with Zoe Valdes , April 2008, DiarioDeMallorca (Spanish)

1928 births
2021 deaths
Cuban expatriates in France
Cuban male painters
Cuban photographers